Uziel or Uzziel is documented as a Jewish family name in early 15th century Spain.

Notable people with this surname include: 

 Ben-Zion Meir Hai Uziel
 Isaac Uziel
 Jacob Uziel
 Joseph Uziel
 Judah Uziel
 Samuel Uziel
 Yonatan Uziel

See also
 (the father of) Jonathan ben Uzziel
 Hayyim ben Abraham Uziel
 Samuel ben Joseph Uziel
 Uziel Gal,  designer of the Uzi submachine gun
 Uzi

Jewish surnames
Hebrew-language surnames
Sephardic surnames